Thliptoceras fenestratum is a moth in the family Crambidae. It was described by Per Olof Christopher Aurivillius in 1910. It is found in Tanzania.

References

Moths described in 1910
Pyraustinae